Delicious Rendezvous is a South Korean show. It aired on SBS TV on Thursdays at 21:00 (KST). The show ended on September 9, 2021, after 90 episodes.

Audience rating

Broadcast timeline

Format 
Delicious Rendezvous is a program that develops new menus using low demand local specialties to help farmers. Originally, the concept was to sell these menus at meeting places with large floating populations, such as rest areas, airports, and railway stations, to make them popular dishes, but this part of the concept was removed after it was noticed that these places simplified the recipes and sold unsatisfactory version of the dishes to the public, leading to negative comments. It was originally scheduled to be aired for only 12 episodes, but continued on for the first half of 2020 due to favorable reviews.

 Delicious Shopping Live – The show's live home shopping broadcasts feature the cast selling a specific local specialty to viewers in order to help out local farmers, and they already have an impressive record of consistently selling out their product each week.
 The King of Salesmen – Baek Jong-won tries to sell a specific local specialty to companies for consumer consumption by developing various products such as home meal kits and new desserts. The products have been reported to have continuously sell out in stores.

Cast members

List of episodes

Series overview

2019

2020

2021

Ratings

Cancellation of broadcasting

Awards and nominations

References 

2019 South Korean television series debuts
2010s South Korean television series
Korean-language television shows
South Korean cooking television series
South Korean variety television shows
South Korean reality television series
Seoul Broadcasting System original programming